GraphicAudio is an audiobook publishing imprint of RBMedia. Its tagline is "A Movie In Your Mind".  The GraphicAudio format includes a full cast of actors, narration, sound effects and cinematic music. GraphicAudio has published over 1,600 action-adventure titles and over 180 series in the fantasy, science fiction, post-apocalyptic, comic and western genres.

History 
GraphicAudio began in 2004 as an independent company. GraphicAudio is located in Rockville, Maryland and produces everything in its own production studios, duplication and distribution facility.

In March 2020, RBMedia acquired GraphicAudio.

Facilities 
The audio production facility has been around since 1971. In addition to producing audiobooks, GraphicAudio has an onsite manufacturing facility and a sound preservation laboratory.

Audiobooks and series
GraphicAudio has produced Elizabeth Moon's Vatta's War and The Serrano Legacy series and Elmer Kelton's Texas Ranger Series.

In 2007, DC Comics and GraphicAudio released the audio book versions of Infinite Crisis and 52. In 2008 and 2009, GraphicsAudio released a series of Justice League of America audiobooks, followed in May 2009 by an audiobook version of Crisis on Infinite Earths, and that summer by Batman: Dead White and Batman: Inferno. GraphicAudio has since released Countdown, Final Crisis, Batman: No Man's Land, and other titles. The most recent DC release was Its Superman! in March 2014.

In 2012, GraphicAudio confirmed they would also be releasing audiobook versions of Marvel Comics Prose Novels from March 2013 onward. These were Civil War and a Marvel Pocket Spider-Man focused novel entitled Drowned In Thunder. Over 2014, the Marvel Pocket novels The Ultimates: Tomorrow Men and The Ultimates: Against All Enemies were released, followed by  Iron Man: Extremis, Astonishing X-Men: Gifted, New Avengers: Breakout, and Guardians of the Galaxy: Rocket Raccoon and Groot Steal The Galaxy! In 2015, The Death of Captain America, Secret Wars, X-Men: Days of Future Past, Avengers: Everyone Wants to Rule the World, and Ant Man: Natural Enemy were released.

GraphicAudio produces USA Today bestselling author William W. Johnstone's Western and Action Adventure series such as Eagles, Blood Bond, The First Mountain Man, The Last Gunfighter, The Mountain Man (Smoke Jensen) and Sidewinders.

Some of the series and titles published are A Town Called Fury, Blood Bond, Blood Valley, Border Empire Trilogy, Dante Valentine, DC Comics, Deathlands, Deathstalker, The Demon Wars Saga, The Destroyer (novel series), Dragon King Trilogy, Doomsday Warrior, Eagles, Earth Blood, Elantris, Executioner, The First Mountain Man, The Forrest Kingdom Saga, The Gospel of Mark, Jackknife, The Last Gunfighter, The Loner, Mack Bolan, Mark Dalton (series), Mistborn, The Mountain Man, The Night Angel Trilogy, North America's Forgotten Past, Outlanders, Rogue Angel, The Serrano Legacy, Sidewinders, Sons of Texas, Stony Man, The Survivalist, Texas Rangers, Vampire Earth, Vatta's War, Wayne of Gotham and Warbreaker.

Authors published by GraphicAudio

References

External links
Official Website 
Official International Website
GraphicAudio at Soundcloud.com

Audiobook companies and organizations
Book publishing companies of the United States
Online retailers of the United States
Small press publishing companies
Companies based in Bethesda, Maryland
Radio production companies
Publishing companies established in 2004